The A-League Pre-Season Challenge Cup competition was an annual soccer tournament held for all A-League clubs in July and August in the lead up to the start of the A-League season. The competition featured a group stage and a knockout stage. Commentators did not give much weight to the competition as a guide for performance during the season proper, as injuries or club strategic policy ruled that many teams did not use their best players and often used experimental tactics. The Pre-Season Cup was removed from the 2009–10 A-League schedule in order to give the clubs more control over their own pre-season training.

History

2005–2006
The inaugural A-League Pre-Season Challenge Cup was won by Central Coast Mariners after they beat the reigning NSL Champions, Perth Glory 1–0 in the grand final. The event was a huge success and attracted clubs to thoroughly prepare for their A-League endeavours.
A new format allowed matches for: third, fifth and seventh place as well as a grand final. A trophy was given to the teams that finished first, second and third. Adelaide United won the Grand Final after beating reigning champions Central Coast Mariners 5–4 on penalties after 1–1 at the end of extra time. Sydney FC finished in third place.

2007–2008
The 2007 edition had an identical format as the 2006 edition, it was won by Adelaide United after they came back from 1–0 down to win the game 2–1, 9,606 spectators attended the grand final and just over 3,500 spectators attended the third place play-off where Brisbane Roar beat Central Coast Mariners 3–1 after the Roar received two red cards during the match.

, Caloundra, Mandurah and  all hosted matches for the first time.  The Format changed again, the third, fifth and seventh place matches were removed and the top team from each group played each other instead of the regular knockout format.  Melbourne Victory won the last ever A-League Pre-Season Challenge Cup after beating Wellington Phoenix 8–7 in a penalty shoot-out after a 0–0 score at the end of extra time.

Format

In the Pre-Season Cup, the teams were evenly placed into two groups. Each team played the others in the group once over three rounds.

Beginning in 2006, an additional bonus round was then held, with each team playing a cross-over match with a team from a different group. In addition to the standard points (3 for a win, 1 for a draw), there were special bonus points on offer for the bonus round matches:
 1 bonus point for 2 goals scored by a team,
 2 bonus points for 3 goals scored by a team, or
 3 bonus points for 4 or more goals scored by a team.
 4 bonus points for scoring 5 goals by a player. 

This format was edited for the 2007 competition. The bonus round was removed, and the bonus points system introduced into each of the first three rounds. All eight teams then entered a knock-out round, culminating in the final in late August.

Results by club

Past tournaments/winners

Records
Most tournament wins (team): 2 wins, Adelaide United
Most final appearances (team): 2, Adelaide United, Central Coast Mariners & Perth Glory
Most goals scored in a match (team): 5 goals, by Queensland Roar vs. New Zealand Knights, 30 July 2005
Biggest win: New Zealand Knights 0–5 Queensland Roar, group stage, 30 July 2005
Biggest win in a final: Central Coast Mariners 1–0 Perth Glory, 20 August 2005 & Adelaide United 2–1 Perth Glory, 12 August 2007.
Most penalties in a deciding penalty shootout: 8 – Wellington Phoenix 7–8 Melbourne Victory (6 August 2008)

References

External links

 
Soccer cup competitions in Australia
Recurring sporting events established in 2005
Recurring events disestablished in 2008